Phoenix House is a nonprofit drug and alcohol rehabilitation organization operating in ten states with 150 programs. Programs serve individuals, families, and communities affected by substance abuse and dependency.

History 

Phoenix House was founded in 1967 by six heroin addicts who met at a detoxification program in a New York hospital. They were concerned about staying clean after detoxification, so they moved from New York City’s Addiction Services Agency (ASA) soon incorporated structure and treatment programming into the community. As Commissioner of ASA for rehabilitation, Dr. Mitchell Rosenthal, who had spent time observing Synanon used their methods and model of treatment to start Phoenix House the model for a citywide treatment network. The most obvious Synanon methods used within the Phoenix House program are the stripping of your identity on admission, encounter groups (called The Game by Synanon and Phoenix House), work-based treatment. Phoenix House played a role in creating the country’s first correctional treatment unit, a model now widely replicated in prisons throughout the country and abroad. Phoenix House was also an early provider of treatment as an alternative to prison. In 1983, Phoenix House opened its first Phoenix House Academy, a residential high school where teens receive substance abuse treatment as well as daily on-site academic education. Eleven Phoenix House Academies now operate in seven states and have been designated a “model program” by the U.S. Department of Justice in 2005. The organization is funded mostly by government contracts, but also receives philanthropic support for a portion of its $100 million annual budget. In addition to residential treatment, Phoenix House’s continuum of care includes prevention and education, outpatient services, sober living and recovery support, as well as specialty programs for mothers with young children, criminal justice clients, and the military community.

Controversy 
Phoenix House treated adolescents in various facilities until 2015, when their Descanso, CA location, which opened in 1986, closed after numerous reports were investigated by San Diego County Department of Social Services, with whom Phoenix House had contracts for nearly twenty years. It was found that a female counselor on staff had sex with a male resident on more than one occasion and had provided him with methamphetamines. Another incident that was investigated and validated was that a male staff member was providing residents with pornography. Around that same time, five residents of the Phoenix House facility in Descanso, CA were involved in a violent brawl involving 15 - 20 male adolescent residents, which resulted in one adolescent being severely beaten and suffering extensive injuries. During the fight, Phoenix House staff did not intervene, waiting for law enforcement to arrive. State investigators found that the facility was understaffed to begin with. Another incident found by California State Investigators involved two Phoenix House adolescent residents who walked away from an off-campus outing to a Mission Valley mall in San Diego and were later found in Poway, CA, testing positive for drugs. Phoenix House Descanso announced a week after that incident that they were closing the facility for financial reasons.

Beneficiaries

Phoenix Houses of New York 
In New York, where the first Phoenix House program opened in 1967 and the Phoenix House Academy model was introduced in 1983, Phoenix House now provides a range of programs that includes afterschool outpatient treatment for adolescents and their families, residential and outpatient options for adults and adolescents, programs for mothers with small children, programs that serve clients with co-occurring mental illness, and support services for substance abusers in recovery.

Phoenix Houses of California 
Since 1979, Phoenix House has offered services in California. Currently, the agency serves more than 18,000 adults and children each day. The comprehensive continuum of care includes prevention; intervention; residential and outpatient treatment for adults and teens; as well as services for veterans, transitional age youth, and clients with co-occurring mental disorders. Phoenix House also offers wraparound services, home-based case management, and recovery support.

Phoenix Houses of New England 
Phoenix Houses of New England – originally called Marathon House – was founded in 1967 by a coalition of social service professionals, clergy, business, and political leaders in Providence, Rhode Island. Today, they operate 45 programs in Connecticut, Maine, Massachusetts, New Hampshire, Rhode Island, and Vermont. In addition to residential and outpatient programs, Phoenix Houses of New England provides services for specific populations, including the homeless, persons involved with the criminal justice system and those charged with driving under the influence.  Most recently, in a partnership with the Gavin Foundation, Phoenix House opened a new detox and transitional unit in Quincy, MA to help address the growing problem with addiction and particularly opioid addiction.

Phoenix Houses of Florida 
Phoenix House has served Florida since the early 1990s, treating Tampa adolescents and adults at their Derek Jeter Center and Adult Outpatient Counseling Center, respectively. Adults with advanced substance abuse or substance abuse complicated by mental health conditions are treated at Phoenix House’s Citra residential facility in Marion County.

Phoenix Houses of Texas 
Phoenix Houses of Texas was founded in 1995 and currently operates programs in Dallas, Austin and the Houston/Galveston Bay area. Among these are two Phoenix House Academies for teens in Austin and Dallas. Services range from early intervention to long-term aftercare, and they also operate a school-based prevention program that reaches 15,000 Texas teens annually. Additionally, Phoenix Houses of Texas provide afterschool and out-patient programs.

Phoenix Houses of the Mid-Atlantic 
Phoenix Houses of the Mid-Atlantic — formerly known as Vanguard Services Unlimited — serves individuals struggling with substance abuse in  Maryland, New York, Washington, D.C., Delaware, Pennsylvania, and New Jersey. Programs provide residential, transitional, and outpatient treatment with gender-specific programs to adults and adolescents.  A Spanish-speaking men’s residential program is also offered.

Celebrity involvement 
Completing work on Cadillac Records, Beyoncé Knowles donated her entire salary to Phoenix House. Beyoncé also visited the Phoenix House Career Academy at Jay Street in Brooklyn, New York in preparation for portraying singer Etta James, who was once addicted to heroin.  Beyoncé and her mother and business partner Tina Knowles later founded the Career Academy’s Beyoncé Cosmetology Center, which offers a seven-month cosmetology training program for adults.

Grammy-nominated singer/songwriter Kara DioGuardi created and contributes to the Phoenix Rising Music Program, which includes recording studios in three Phoenix House Academy facilities. The program teaches teens how to operate music recording equipment and how to record their own music as part of their music therapy programs.

Phoenix House is thanked in the liner notes of Velvet Gloves and Spit.

Affiliates 
Phoenix House is affiliated with COAF (Center on Addiction and the Family). COAF helps families affected by alcohol and other drug abuse and also runs the Facts on Tap education campaign for college students.

Phoenix House was also established in the UK as an entirely separate organisation, though has its origins in the USA-based Phoenix House described above. Phoenix House (UK) runs a number of residential rehabilitation units, structured day programs and is the largest not for profit provider of prison based substance misuse programmes in the UK. In November 2006, Phoenix House (UK) rebranded to trade under the name 'Phoenix Futures.

Drug policy 

The organization's past president opposed the legalization of marijuana, and has opposed needle exchanges to provide clean needles to addicts.

See also
Alcoholism
Drug abuse
Drug addiction
Drug rehabilitation

References

CLARK, CLAIRE D. The Recovery Revolution: The Battle Over Addiction Treatment in the United States. Columbia University Press, 2017. JSTOR, www.jstor.org/stable/10.7312/clar17638. Accessed 1 Sept. 2020.Copy

External links
Phoenix House
Phoenix Academy
Phoenix Futures (UK)
Facts on Tap
xamres

Addiction organizations in the United States
Non-profit organizations based in New York City
Drug and alcohol rehabilitation centers
Mental health organizations in New York (state)